Gerald Rudolf Pangkali (born 20 October 1982) is an Indonesian former professional footballer. He played at Indonesia against Nepal. However, this match not included in FIFA "A" Match

Personal life
Pangkali like many of his Papuan teammates is Christian, after scoring a goal in the 2015 AFC Cup he took off his shirt to reveal the phrase "I Love Jesus".

In May 2016, Beroperay, along with teammates Yohanes Pahabol and Roni Beroperay graduated from the Cenderawasih University in Jayapura with a Bachelor of Laws.

Honours

Club honors
Persipura Jayapura
Indonesia Super League (2): 2008–09, 2010–11
Indonesian Community Shield (1): 2009
Indonesian Inter Island Cup (1): 2011

References

External links
 profil in Liga Indonesia Official Website 

1982 births
Living people
Papuan people
People from Jayapura
Indonesian Christians
Indonesian footballers
Association football midfielders
Indonesian Super League-winning players
Indonesian Premier Division players
Liga 1 (Indonesia) players
PSPS Pekanbaru players
Pelita Jaya FC players
Persija Jakarta players
Persipura Jayapura players
Cenderawasih University alumni
Sportspeople from Papua